Zlaté Hory (until 1948 Cukmantl) is a town in Jeseník District in the Olomouc Region of the Czech Republic. It has about 3,600 inhabitants. The historic town centre is well preserved and is protected by law as an urban monument zone.

Administrative parts

Villages of Dolní Údolí, Horní Údolí, Ondřejovice, Rejvíz, Rožmitál and Salisov are administrative parts of Zlaté Hory.

Etymology
The name literally means "Golden Mountains".

Geography
Zlaté Hory is located in the historical region of Czech Silesia on the border with Poland. It lies in the Zlatohorská Highlands, which gave it its modern name. The southernmost part extends to the Hrubý Jeseník mountain range.

Several small watercourses flows through the municipal territory. The Zlatý Stream flows through the town proper. The area is rich in springs.

History

Golden mines in the Zlaté Hory area were first mentioned in a document from 1224. Edelštejn Castle was founded near the gold mines for their protection. Zlaté Hory (under its old name Cukmantl) was first mentioned in 1263. The area with the gold mines was very attractive and in the 13th century the Přemyslid dukes and the bishops of Wrocław competed for it. In 1306, the settlement was promoted to a town by its then owner, Duke Nicholas I.

Until the mid-15th century, the town was ruled the Opavian dukes except for the period between 1361 and 1367, when it was owned by King John of Bohemia. In 1440, Zlaté Hory was bought by Bolko V the Hussite, who had repaired the Edelštejn Castle and granted the town Magdeburg rights. King George of Poděbrady acquired the town from Bolko's brother Nicholas I of Opole in 1465. Two years later, Edelštejn Castle was attacked and destroyed by Jošt of Rožmberk and after the conclusion of the agreement, Zlaté Hory passed under the rule of the bishops of Wrocław for the following centuries. The town was included within the ecclesiastical Duchy of Nysa, under suzerainty of the Bohemian Crown.

During the Thirty Years' War, Zlaté Hory was repeatedly looted by the Swedish troops. In the second half of the 17th century, the town was at the centre of the infamous Northern Moravia witch trials, during which 54 women were burned. Despite these events, the town experienced economic growth, and linen began to develop.

According to the Austrian census of 1910 the town had 4,520 inhabitants, 100% were German-speaking. Most populous religious group were Roman Catholics with 4,441 (98.3%). Following World War I, it was part of Czechoslovakia.

During the World War II, the German occupiers operated four forced labour subcamps (E256, E446, E779, E786) of the Stalag VIII-B/344 prisoner-of-war camp in the town. On 29 January 1945, German SS soldiers were conducting a death march in the area and murdered 138 prisoners on a road from Konradów.

Demographics

Economy
Modern mining of non-ferrous metal ores, gold and silver was terminated in 1993. In 2019, a geological survey was launched to find out how much gold is still in the deposits and whether reserves of other metals such as copper, zinc and lead are present. Based on the results of the survey and other factors, mining activity may be resumed.

Sights

The historic town centre is formed by the Svobody Square and its surroundings. Houses in the centre usually have an older Renaissance or Baroque core with an Empire-style reconstruction of the façade from the early 19th century. The landmarks of the town square are the town hall and the Old Post building. Old Post dates from 1698 and has richly decorated façade with Corinthian columns. Today it houses the Town Museum, focused on the mining tradition of the area and the 17th-century witch trials. In front of the town hall stands a Baroque statue of Saint Joseph from 1731.

There are three churches in Zlaté Hory and several smaller sacral monuments. In the town centre are located the Church of the Assumption of the Virgin Mary and the Church of the Holy Cross. The pilgrimage Church of Mary Help of Christians is situated in the hills south from the town. The Church of the Assumption of the Virgin Mary is the landmark of the town. The originally early Gothic structure was rebuilt to its current Baroque form after a fire in 1699. The Baroque Church of the Holy Cross dates from 1764–1768. Today its chamber environment serves mainly cultural purposes.

Ruins of the castles Edelštejn, Koberštejn and Leuchtenštejn are located in the hills around the town. However, only little of them has survived to this day. Edelštejn and Koberštejn are protected as cultural monuments.

The old mining galleries are also protected as cultural monuments. Some are open to the public.

It was built in 1898 on the occasion of 50 years of the reign of Emperor Franz Joseph I.

Notable people
Jindřich František Boblig of Edelstadt (1612–1698), inquisitor
Victor Franke (1865–1936), German general
Kurt Knispel (1921–1945), German tank commander

Twin towns – sister cities

Zlaté Hory is twinned with:
 Głuchołazy, Poland
 Kętrzyn, Poland
 Vodňany, Czech Republic

Zlaté Hory also cooperates with Prague 1 and Mikulovice in the Czech Republic.

Gallery

References

External links

Cities and towns in the Czech Republic
Populated places in Jeseník District
Cities in Silesia
Mining communities in the Czech Republic
Czech Silesia